

Teams
At the end of the previous season Odred Ljubljana and Rabotnički were relegated from top level. They were replaced by NK Zagreb and Željezničar.

League table

Results

Winning squad
Champions:
Hajduk Split (coach: Aleksandar Tomašević)

players (league matches/league goals): 
Davor Grčić (26 apps; 1 goal)
Slavko Luštica (26 apps; 1 goal)
Bernard Vukas (26 apps; 20 goals)
Joško Vidošević (26 apps; 18 goals)
Ljubomir Kokeza (25 apps)
Sulejman Rebac (23 apps; 9 goals)
Vladimir Šenauer (22 apps; 7 goals)
Frane Matošić (21 apps; 8 goals)
Vladimir Beara (20 apps)
Božo Broketa (20 apps; 1 goal)
Lenko Grčić (20 apps)
Nikola Radović (20 apps; 1 goal)
Ante Vulić (6 apps)
Bogdan Kragić (3 apps; 3 goals)
Davor Benčić (1 app)
Leo Dadić (1 app)

Top scorers

See also
1954–55 Yugoslav Second League
1954 Yugoslav Cup

External links
Yugoslavia Domestic Football Full Tables

Yugoslav First League seasons
Yugo
1